In enzymology, a D-amino-acid transaminase is an enzyme that catalyzes the chemical reaction:

D-alanine + 2-oxoglutarate  pyruvate + D-glutamate

Thus, the two substrates of this enzyme are D-alanine and 2-oxoglutarate, whereas its two products are pyruvate and D-glutamate.

This enzyme belongs to the family of transferases, specifically the transaminases, which transfer nitrogenous groups.  The systematic name of this enzyme class is D-alanine:2-oxoglutarate aminotransferase. Other names in common use include D-aspartate transaminase, D-alanine aminotransferase, D-aspartic aminotransferase, D-alanine-D-glutamate transaminase, D-alanine transaminase, and D-amino acid aminotransferase.  This enzyme participates in 6 metabolic pathways: lysine degradation, arginine and proline metabolism, phenylalanine metabolism, D-arginine and D-ornithine metabolism, D-alanine metabolism, and peptidoglycan biosynthesis.  It employs one cofactor, pyridoxal phosphate.

Structural studies

References

 
 
 
 
 
 
 
 
 

EC 2.6.1
Pyridoxal phosphate enzymes
Enzymes of known structure